Just Another Blonde (also known as The Girl From Coney Island) is a 1926 American silent romantic comedy / adventure film distributed by First National Pictures. Based on the short story "Even Stev'en" by Gerald Beaumont, the film was directed by Alfred Santell and stars Dorothy Mackaill, Jack Mulhall, and Louise Brooks.

Cast
Dorothy Mackaill as Jeanne Cavanaugh
Jack Mulhall as Jimmy O'Connor
Louise Brooks as Diana O'Sullivan
William Collier, Jr. as Kid Scotty

Preservation
An incomplete print of Just Another Blonde is preserved at the UCLA Film and Television Archive.

See also
List of lost films

References

External links

 
 Lobby poster #1 (Wayback Machine)
 Lobby poster #2(Wayback Machine)

1926 films
1920s adventure comedy films
1926 romantic comedy films
American adventure comedy films
American romantic comedy films
American silent feature films
American black-and-white films
Films based on short fiction
Films directed by Alfred Santell
First National Pictures films
Lost American films
1926 lost films
1920s American films
Silent romantic comedy films
Silent adventure films
Silent American comedy films